Alexander Ferguson (1860–1925) was an Ontario politician.

Alexander Ferguson may also refer to:

Alex Ferguson (born 1941), Scottish former football manager and player
Alex Ferguson (footballer, born 1903) (1903–1974), Scottish professional footballer

See also
Sandy Ferguson (disambiguation) (Sandy is a Scottish diminutive of Alexander)
Alex Ferguson (disambiguation)
Alejandro "Alec" Ferguson (born 1978), Argentine cricketer
Alexander Ferguson MacLaren (1854–1917), Canadian businessman and politician